 
Newman's End is a hamlet in the civil parish of Matching, and the Epping Forest district  of  Essex, England.

History
At the then Smallway's Farm in the mid-1700s was a malt house, by at latest 1843 using grain from a field to the west of the farm. At the north-east of Parsonage Farm are the remains of a possible medieval moat, now a scheduled monument.

There are four Grade II listed structures at Newman's End:

'Parsonage Farmhouse', a four bay timber framed and plastered two storey house, with pargetting details, dating to the 17th century;
'Parsonage Farm barn', a timber framed weatherboarded barn dating to the 17th century;
'Red Tile Cottages', a timber framed, tiled roofed cottage dating to the 16th century, and in 1609 part of Housham Hall manor;
'Pump on the Green', late 19th-century cast iron water pump

Matching parish settlements
 Carter's Green
 Housham Tye
 Matching
 Matching Green
 Matching Tye
 Newman's End

References

External links

Hamlets in Essex
Matching, Essex